Hody is a village in Wallonia and a district of the municipality of Anthisnes, located in the province of Liège, Belgium.

Archaeological findings indicate that there may have been a Roman villa at the site. The current village is mentioned in written sources for the first time in 1209. The village church is a listed historical monument and contains some of the most accomplished stucco decorations in Baroque style in Wallonia. It was restored in 1985. There is also a château in the village, mostly dating from 1910 but built around an older core, a building from the 17th century.

References

External links

Populated places in Liège Province